Liam Burrows is an Australian musician and singer. He first came to prominence in 2011 when he reached the Grand Final of the fifth season of Australia's Got Talent in which he was awarded the fifth place in the overall competition in which 19,000 participants had originally entered. His independently released debut album, All of Me, came out in 2011.

Early life and education
Liam Burrows was born and raised in The Central Coast of New South Wales and comes from a musical family. Burrows' father Steve is ex-Australian Navy. His mother, Gemma is a high school music teacher. He has one younger sister – Ailish. He played classical piano from the age of six, classical and jazz trumpet from the age of nine and sang at school events from the first year of high school.  When Burrows was 12, his singing teacher, jazz musician Dorian Mode, introduced him to the Great American Songbook. This ignited Burrow's passion for jazz.  As a teen he performed with the Chatswood High School Stage Band at the Montreux Jazz Festival and has cited the school's music program as a major influence.

In 2014 Burrows completed the Musical Theatre Open Program at the National Institute of Dramatic Art (NIDA). He is currently completing a Bachelor of Music Degree, majoring in Contemporary Performance.

Career
Burrows has headlined at major jazz festivals around Australia including those at Manly, Noosa, Broadbeach, Adelaide Hills and Norfolk Island and also at major venues including the Crown Casino Melbourne, Jupiters Casino Townsville and Jupiters Casino Broadbeach.

Burrows' appearances on national television in Australia include Channel 7's The Morning Show, Channel Ten's The Circle the Royal Children's Hospital Good Friday Telethon and the Channel 7 Perth Telethon. He also performed as the opening act for the Pointer Sisters during their national tour of Australia.

In 2011 he recorded his debut album with The Swing City Big Band. All of Me is a selection of classic hit songs including many from the Great American Songbook.

Burrows recently completed a number of recordings of original works including tracks written by multi-award-winning songwriter Graeham Goble of Little River Band fame.

He has performed (2014) in Hong Kong for the British Chamber of Commerce and Hong Kong Polo After Dark and as of March 2015 has performed his first shows on a cruise ship.

In November 2015 Liam appeared for the first time in New Zealand, when he appeared in a Sinatra Centenary Concert in Auckland, backed by a 24 piece orchestra.

Recognition
At age 14 Burrows won the Open Age Jazz Vocal Division of The Sydney Eisteddfod and was awarded The Central Coast Jazz League Scholarship for Most Promising Young Artist.  In 2010 Burrows became the youngest-ever vocalist selected to perform at Generations in Jazz. In the same year he was nominated for an Australian entertainment industry Mo Award for Best new Talent and later in the year was featured at the Newcastle Jazz Festival as an Outstanding Young Talent.

In 2011 Burrows was once again selected by James Morrison to perform at Generations in Jazz. At the age of 17 Burrows competed in the fifth season of Australia's Got Talent. During the show he cited Michael Bublé and Frank Sinatra as major role models and influences.

In 2012 Burrows competed in the Unsigned Only Music Competition, a talent search to locate artists who are not yet signed to record labels.  Burrows came second in the Vocal Performance category.  That same year, he was named Best Jazz Artist at the Australian Music Industry’s Musicoz Awards.

In 2013 Burrows won a Mo Award: The Johnny O'Keefe Award. In the same year he again competed in the International Unsigned Only competition with 10,000 entrants, gaining an Honorable Mention. In that same year he was also a finalist in the Jazz Category of the MusicOz Awards.

In 2014 Burrows again competed in the Unsigned Only Music Competition. He won Second Place in the Vocal Performance category for his rendition of "Skylark" and also received an Honourable Mention for his performance of "Never Fallen In Love So Easily Before."

In 2015, James Morrison presented Burrows with the Generations in Jazz Vocal Scholarship.

In 2015 Burrows again won Second Place in the Unsigned-Only Music Competition. He also received two Honourable Mentions.

In 2015 Liam was also one of only 11 semi-finalists in the prestigious Thelonious Monk Institute International Jazz Vocals Competition which took place in Los Angeles. The vocal competition takes place every 5 years and attracts hundreds of entries from all over the world. Liam was the only semi-finalist from the southern hemisphere.

Major awards and nominations

Charitable affiliations
Burrows is a Youth Ambassador for the following organisations:

Angels Hope – Australian Anti-Bullying Organisation
Australian Children’s Music Foundation
Saves Our Sons

Discography

Albums

References

Living people
Australia's Got Talent contestants
Australian child singers
1994 births
21st-century Australian singers
21st-century Australian male singers